North-West North 2 was an English Rugby Union league which was at the eleventh tier of the domestic competition and was available to teams in Cumbria and the northern part of Lancashire.  Promoted teams moved up to North-West North 1 and as the division was the lowest level for clubs in the region there was no relegation.  The division ran for three seasons from 1987 to 1990 until it was cancelled due to a falling number of teams.  All remaining clubs in the division were promoted/transferred into North-West North 1 for the start of the 1990–91 campaign.

Original teams
When league rugby began in 1987 this division contained the following teams:

Ambleside
British Steel
Clitheroe
Lancaster Moor Hospital
Silloth
Smith Brothers
Thornton Cleveleys
Upper Eden

North-West North 2 honours

Number of league titles

Silloth
Thornton Cleveleys
Upper Eden

Notes

References

See also
 Cumbria 1
 Cumbria 2
 English Rugby Union Leagues
 English rugby union system
 Rugby union in England

11